The Mantanzas least gecko (Sphaerodactylus intermedius) is a species of lizard in the family Sphaerodactylidae. It is endemic to Cuba.

References

Sphaerodactylus
Reptiles of Cuba
Endemic fauna of Cuba
Reptiles described in 1919